"Ain't Too Proud to Beg" is a 1966 song and hit single by The Temptations for Motown Records' Gordy label, produced by Norman Whitfield and written by Whitfield and Edward Holland Jr. The song peaked at number 13 on the Billboard Pop Chart, and was a number-one hit on the Billboard R&B charts for eight non-consecutive weeks. The song's success, in the wake of the relative underperformance of the previous Temptations' single, "Get Ready", resulted in Norman Whitfield replacing Smokey Robinson, producer of "Get Ready", as The Temptations' main producer. In 2004 it finished number 94 in AFI's 100 Years...100 Songs poll thanks to its inclusion in The Big Chill soundtrack.

Background

Motown had a policy that the producer who had the biggest hits on a particular artist was assigned as the main producer for that artist, and was given preference when singles were selected for release by Motown's Quality Control department. By 1966, Motown artist, songwriter, and producer Smokey Robinson had by that default earned creative control over The Temptations, after a string of hits such as "The Way You Do the Things You Do", "My Girl", and "Since I Lost My Baby".

Norman Whitfield, an up-and-coming songwriter and producer at Motown who'd had some success with Marvin Gaye and The Velvelettes, had worked with the Temptations on singles such as "Girl (Why You Wanna Make Me Blue)" (1964), and coveted Robinson's role as their producer. Finally creating an instrumental track he thought would make it, Whitfield enlisted lyricist Edward Holland Jr. (of Holland–Dozier–Holland fame) to write lyrics to Whitfield's instrumental. Although Holland didn't think Whitfield had a chance of stealing Robinson's act (especially since Robinson was Motown CEO Berry Gordy's best friend), he contributed his services to the song, resulting in "Ain't Too Proud to Beg".

Composition

The song's lyrics feature its narrator pleading for a second chance with his departing lover, opening with the determined statement "I know you wanna leave me/but I refuse to let you go." The narrator goes on to state that he "ain't too proud to beg" or "plead" his lover to stay. The Temptations were pleased with the composition, feeling that the song's blues-inspired melody and James Brown-esque horn stabs would help to update their sound. David Ruffin was tapped to sing lead on the song, and Whitfield submitted the mix to Motown's Quality Control department.

Cash Box described the song as a "plaintive, slow-shufflin’ blues-soaked ode about a love-sick fella who'll go any lengths to keep his gal at his side."

Personnel
 David Ruffinlead vocals
 Eddie Kendricks, Melvin Franklin, Paul Williams, and Otis Williamsbacking vocals
 The Funk Brothersinstrumentation
Henry Cosbytenor saxophone solo
Earl Van DykeHammond organ
Johnny GriffithWurlitzer electronic piano
Joe Messinaguitar
James Jamersonbass guitar
Uriel Jonesdrums
Jack Ashfordtambourine
Eddie "Bongo" Brownpercussion

Production

On Friday mornings at Motown's Hitsville USA offices, the creative team held Quality Control meetings, at which potential single releases were voted for or against release. To Whitfield's disappointment, "Ain't Too Proud to Beg" failed twice to make it through Motown's Friday morning Quality Control meetings, with Berry Gordy commenting that the song was good, but "needed more story". For the third recorded version of "Ain't Too Proud", Whitfield had David Ruffin's lead vocal arranged just above his actual vocal range. As a result, the singer was forced to strain through numerous takes in order to get out all of the song's high notes. By the end of the "Ain't Too Proud" recording session, recalls Temptation Otis Williams, Ruffin was "drowning in sweat and his glasses were all over his face".

By this point, both the Temptations and Whitfield were confident they had a major hit on their hands. However, both "Ain't Too Proud" and "Get Ready", a Temptations track produced by Smokey Robinson with Eddie Kendricks on lead, turned up at the same Quality Control meeting. Since Robinson was the Temptations' main producer, his song was released and Whitfield's was shelved. Cornelius Grant, the Temptations' road guitarist, band director, and songwriter, recalled that after that decision was made, "it was as if the veins jumped out of Norman's neck." Whitfield was less than pleased at the Quality Control department's decision, and stated plainly that "never again am I gonna lose out on a release like that".. As a compromise, Gordy promised Whitfield that "Ain't Too Proud" would be the next single if "Get Ready" failed to reach the Top 20 on the Billboard Pop Chart.

Release

"Get Ready" reached number one on the Billboard R&B charts, but only number 29 on the pop charts. As promised, "Ain't Too Proud To Beg" was released as the next single. It also reached number one on the R&B charts, but made it into the top twenty at number thirteen. "Ain't Too Proud" replaced Sam & Dave's "Hold On! I'm a Comin'" as the R&B number-one single during the week of June 18, 1966, and held the position for four weeks until being replaced by Ray Charles' "Let's Go Get Stoned" during the week of July 16. The following week, Ain't Too Proud returned to the number-one position, where it remained for four more weeks until being replaced the week of August 20 by another Motown single, Stevie Wonder's cover of Bob Dylan's "Blowin' in the Wind".

The Temptations had been on tour during all of the office politics involving the release of "Ain't Too Proud to Beg", and only learned about the record being a hit when they were contacted by Motown an hour before an August 20, 1966, performance on American Bandstand and ordered to perform it. Temptation Paul Williams quickly devised a dance routine for the song, and the group lip-synched the song for the American Bandstand viewing audience.

Much of the song's success, according to the Temptations themselves, is due to Whitfield's production, which was leaner and hit harder than Robinson's smoother style, and also to David Ruffin's pained lead vocal. The tactic of having Ruffin record above his register worked well enough that Whitfield went on to use it on later Temptations records such as "Beauty Is Only Skin Deep" and "(I Know) I'm Losing You", and also did the same to Marvin Gaye when he recorded his now-famous version of "I Heard It Through the Grapevine".

Rick Astley version 

Rick Astley covered the song for his 1988 album Hold Me in Your Arms, and released it as a single in the US and Japan in the summer of 1989.

This was Astley's last single with producers Stock Aitken Waterman.  On New Year's Eve 2019, Astley performed the song with YolanDa Brown on the BBC's Jools' Annual Hootenanny.

The single peaked at number 89 on the Billboard Hot 100 and at number 16 on the Adult Contemporary charts.

The Rolling Stones version 
The Rolling Stones recorded the song for their album It's Only Rock 'n Roll (1974). They also released it as a single, which reached number 17 in the Billboard Hot 100 singles chart. The official promotional video features the band, in bright clothing, performing the song on a stage. In 2007 the band performed the song at Isle of Wight Festival with Amy Winehouse.

Record World said that the Stones' "first oldie hit stab in a decade is more than proud
to boogie!"

Notes
 Williams, Otis and Romanowski, Patricia, Temptations.
 Weinger, Harry, "Sunshine on a Cloudy Day".

References

Other sources
 Posner, Gerald (2002). Motown : Music, Money, Sex, and Power. New York: Random House. .
 Weinger, Harry (1994). "Sunshine on a Cloudy Day". The Temptations: Emperors of Soul [CD Box Set]. New York: Motown Record Co., L.P.
 Williams, Otis and Romanowski, Patricia (1988, updated 2002). Temptations. Lanham, MD: Cooper Square. .

1966 singles
1966 songs
1974 singles
1988 songs
1989 singles
Gordy Records singles
Rick Astley songs
Song recordings produced by Jagger–Richards
Song recordings produced by Norman Whitfield
Songs written by Eddie Holland
Songs written by Norman Whitfield
The Rolling Stones songs
The Temptations songs